Kunter is a Turkish and German surname/name. In ancient Turkish, "Kunt" means strong and it refers to the strength of the large ropes used to tie the ships to the docks and "Er" means "soldier" or "man". Thus "Kunter" is usually used as a male name meaning "strong man, strong soldier", and in Ottoman Turkish it means "kind man". Notable persons with the surname Kunter include:

 Erman Kunter (born 1956), Turkish basketball player
 Peter Kunter (born 1941), German footballer
 Roksan Kunter, daughter of the last Ottoman Emperor

References

Turkish-language surnames